The Women's under-23 time trial at the 2013 European Road Championships took place on 18 July. The Championships were hosted by the Czech Republic city of Olomouc. The course was 22.4 km long. 34 cyclists competed in the time trial.

Top 10 final classification

References

European Road Championships – Women's U23 time trial
2013 European Road Championships
2013 in women's road cycling